is a masculine Japanese given name.

Possible writings
Saburō can be written using different kanji characters and can mean:
三郎, "third son"
三朗, "three, bright"
The name can also be written in hiragana or katakana.

People with the name
, Japanese soldier
, Japanese golfer
, Japanese producer
, Japanese calligrapher and painter
, Japanese historian
, Japanese actor
, Japanese swimmer
, Japanese voice actor
, Japanese footballer and manager
,  Japanese Enka singer
, Japanese diplomat
, Japanese Scout leader
, Japanese composer
, Japanese economist and politician
Saburō Ota, Japanese diplomat, ambassador to Burma
, Japanese World War II fighter pilot
, Japanese sailor
, Japanese-American actor
, Japanese composer
, Japanese choreographer and dancer
, Japanese actor and singer
, Japanese middle-distance runner

Fictional characters
 Saburo Arasaka, a character in the Cyberpunk role-playing game franchise
 Mutsumi Saburo from Sgt. Frog
 Saburo Kato from Space Battleship Yamato
 Saburou Aoyama (aka Goggle Blue) from Dai Sentai Goggle V
 Saburo (aka Hakaider) from Kikaider
 Saburo Ichimonji, the protagonist's third son, from Ran
 Sabnock Saburo from Mairimashita! Iruma-kun

Japanese masculine given names